Baryplegma vulpianum is a species of tephritid or fruit flies in the genus Baryplegma of the family Tephritidae.

Distribution
Costa Rica.

References

Tephritinae
Insects described in 1911
Diptera of South America